Pure Hearts is a 2017 Italian drama film directed by Roberto De Paolis. It was screened in the Directors' Fortnight section at the 2017 Cannes Film Festival.

Cast
 Selene Caramazza as Agnese
 Simone Liberati as Stefano
 Barbora Bobulova as Marta
 Stefano Fresi as Don Luca
 Edoardo Pesce as Lele
 Antonella Attili as Angela
 Isabella Delle Monache as Beatrice

References

External links
 

2017 films
2017 drama films
Italian drama films
2010s Italian-language films
2017 directorial debut films
2010s Italian films